Gesk (also Romanized as Gesg and Kesk; also known as Gesk-e ‘Olyā) is a village in Safiabad Rural District, Bam and Safiabad District, Esfarayen County, North Khorasan Province, Iran. At the 2006 census, its population was 463, in 139 families.

References 

Populated places in Esfarayen County